Ashley John Bayes (born 19 April 1972) is an English former professional footballer who is goalkeeping coach at League One club AFC Wimbledon.

Bayes started his career at Brentford, where he progressed through the youth system to make his first-team debut in March 1990. He spent most of his time at Griffin Park as the club's second-choice goalkeeper, and in 1993, signed for Torquay United on a free transfer. Bayes played regularly during his time at Torquay, making over 100 appearances during his three seasons in Devon. He then joined Exeter City in July 1996, and spent three years there. Bayes returned to London in July 1999 when he signed for Leyton Orient. After three years at Orient, Bayes joined League of Ireland team Bohemians in 2002, winning the league title in his first season with the club. He returned to England in March 2003, and subsequently signed for Conference National club Woking.

He spent the 2003–04 campaign with Woking, before joining Hornchurch of the Conference South ahead of the following season. He left Hornchurch after just three months following the club's financial difficulties, joining divisional rivals Grays Athletic in November 2004. Bayes' three-year tenure with the Essex club was a successful one, securing a Conference South title and two FA Trophy medals. After a season with Crawley Town, Bayes signed for Stevenage on a free transfer in May 2008. The club won the FA Trophy in his first season, before earning back-to-back promotions into League One following their successful 2010–11 season. Bayes left Stevenage in June 2011, signing for Basingstoke Town of the Conference South. He joined AFC Wimbledon, initially as a player-coach, under manager Neal Ardley in June 2013, before later being appointed solely as the club's goalkeeping coach. He also represented England at youth level.

Club career

Early career
Bayes began his career as an apprentice at Brentford, and progressed through the club's academy, making his Football League debut on 20 March 1990 in a home game against Preston North End. He signed his first professional contract on 5 July 1990. Bayes went on to make only three further league appearances over the next three seasons and was released at the end of the 1992–93 season. He made 12 appearances for Brentford in all competitions, including in an away League Cup fixture against Premier League club Tottenham Hotspur.

Following his departure from Brentford, Bayes joined Third Division club Torquay United, signed by then manager Don O'Riordan on 13 August 1993. Although he started the season as second-choice to young goalkeeper Matthew Lowe, Bayes played 32 league games in his first season, and another two games in the play-offs as Torquay lost to Preston North End in the play-off semi-final. He remained a regular the following season, making 37 league appearances as Torquay finished the campaign in mid-table. During his third and final year at Torquay, midway through the 1995–96 season, he lost his place to Ray Newland, and as a result made 28 appearances.

Exeter City
Ahead of the 1996–97 season, Bayes joined local rivals Exeter City of the Third Division on 31 July 1996, signing on a free transfer. He soon established himself as the club's first-choice goalkeeper, making his debut on 17 August 1996 and keeping a clean sheet in the process in a 1–0 away win at Mansfield Town. Bayes made 46 appearances in his maiden season at Exeter, as the club narrowly avoided relegation to the Football Conference, finishing just a point above the relegation place occupied by Hereford United. He remained a regular during the 1997–98 campaign, making 50 appearances in all competitions with the club sitting comfortably in mid-table by the end of the season. 
Bayes won the 1998–99 club Player of the Year award, a campaign in which he was ever-present and made 49 appearances. The club finished the season once again in mid-table, with a strong defensive record only bettered by three of the promotion-chasing teams. He made 145 appearances during his three seasons of first-team football at Exeter.

Leyton Orient
At the end of the 1998–99 season, Bayes turned down a new two-year contract at Exeter, becoming the first Exeter player to leave under the Bosman ruling, and subsequently joined fellow Third Division club Leyton Orient on 5 July 1999. He made his Orient debut on 7 August 1999, in a 2–1 defeat to Carlisle United at Brunton Park. He played regularly during the first half of the campaign, but lost his place to Scott Barrett after a 1–0 loss to Reading in the Football League Trophy on 8 December 1999. He eventually won his first-team place back towards the latter stages of the season, and played in Orient's last nine league matches, making 21 appearances in all competitions in his first season with the East London club. The 2000–01 season was Bayes' most successful season at Leyton Orient, where he made 51 appearances in all competitions as Orient finished the season in fifth place. He also played in their play-off campaign, as the club lost 4–2 to Blackpool in the play-off final at the Millennium Stadium in May 2001. Bayes made just 14 appearances the following season as a persistent shoulder injury hampered his last season with the club. He made 86 appearances during his three-year spell at Orient.

Bohemians
He left Leyton Orient when his contract expired in May 2002. On his departure, Orient manager Paul Brush stated "He's been unlucky with his injury but he needs a new challenge". He subsequently signed for League of Ireland team Bohemians on a free transfer on 31 May 2002. He joined on a three-year contract. Bayes made 27 appearances during the 2002–03 campaign, his only full season with the club, picking up a winners medal in the process as Bohemians finished the season as league champions. The title was sealed courtesy of a 1–0 win over Shelbourne, with Bayes making a crucial save, described as "save of the season", with the game tied at 0–0. Despite his successful first season with Bohemians, Bayes lost his place to Seamus Kelly at the beginning of the following season, and sought after a return to England to play first-team football. He was released from his contract at Bohemians in March 2003, two years earlier than initially agreed.

Woking
Towards the latter stages of the same month, Bayes signed for Conference club Woking on a free transfer, and on a short-team deal for the remainder of the 2002–03 season. He made five appearances in the last month of the season, keeping three clean sheets to help Woking stave off relegation and remain in the highest tier of non-league football. Bayes signed a one-year deal with Woking ahead of the 2003–04 campaign, and played regularly throughout, making 40 appearances, although did briefly lose his place to loanee Scott Bevan. He made 45 appearances in all competitions during his stay at the club.

Grays Athletic
At the end of the season, Bayes was offered a contract extension at Woking, but rejected it in favour of a move to join Conference South club Hornchurch in May 2004. However, he left the club, along with many other players, in November that year, having made just ten league appearances, as Hornchurch suffered a financial collapse. His last game for the club was in a 3–2 victory over Gravesend & Northfleet in the FA Cup on 30 October 2004, a result that booked the club's place in the First Round proper.

He subsequently signed for divisional rivals Grays Athletic on 9 November 2004. Bayes played regularly as Grays secured the Conference South title that season, winning the league by 23 points and conceding just 31 goals in 42 games. He scored his only goal in competitive football in a 3–0 win over Havant & Waterlooville at the New Recreation Ground in April 2005, in the club's final league game of the season. Bayes took a first-half penalty after Gary Hooper had been fouled in the area. Although he missed the penalty, he scored the rebound. He also played in Grays' FA Trophy success during the same season, starting in the final at Villa Park, where he saved a penalty as Grays beat Hucknall Town 6–5 on a penalty shoot-out after the two teams had drawn 1–1 after extra-time. The following season, Bayes started in the club's first ever Conference National fixture, a 1–1 away draw at Burton Albion in August 2005. He made 32 appearances during the season, as the club missed out on back-to-back promotions after losing in the play-off semi-final over two legs to Halifax Town. He also played regularly as the Essex club retained the FA Trophy at the end of the campaign, beating his former club, Woking, 2–0 in the final at Upton Park on 14 May 2006. Under the new management of Justin Edinburgh, Bayes remained first-choice goalkeeper for the 2006–07 season, playing in 42 games. Despite played regularly, he was released by the club in May 2007, in-turn ending his three-year tenure at Grays.

Crawley Town
Despite stating a desire to rejoin Exeter City, he ultimately signed for Conference club Crawley Town on a one-year contract on 19 June 2007. Bayes made his debut for Crawley in the club's opening game of the 2007–08 season, a 2–1 home victory over Stevenage at Broadfield Stadium. He made 46 appearances in all competitions during his only season at the club, with Crawley finishing the campaign in a mid-table position despite having six points deducted for a breach of financial regulations.

Stevenage
Ahead of the 2008–09 season, Bayes signed for Stevenage on a free transfer. He made his Stevenage debut in a 5–0 defeat to Wrexham on 9 August 2008, and played in the following three games. Following the arrival of Chris Day, Bayes featured less frequently. He played in the club's 1–0 victory against Woking on 24 February 2009, as well as keeping a clean sheet in a 4–0 win over Forest Green Rovers in the FA Trophy, a competition Stevenage would go on to win that season. He made seven appearances during his first season with the club. He played five times during the club's 2009–10 campaign, as Stevenage won promotion to the Football League for the first time in the club's history. Whilst Bayes made no first-team appearances for the club the following season, he undertook a number of coaching responsibilities that season, as Stevenage earned back-to-back promotions after beating Torquay United in the play-off final at Old Trafford in May 2011. Bayes left Stevenage a month later to play first-team football and concentrate on his coaching career.

Basingstoke Town
On the same day as his departure from Stevenage was confirmed, on 20 June 2011, Bayes signed for Conference South club Basingstoke Town. A week later, Bayes was added to the backroom staff at Aldershot Town, working part-time as a goalkeeping coach while also registered as a player at Basingstoke. Bayes was named as Basingstoke's captain ahead of the new campaign. He made his debut for the club on the first day of the 2011–12 season, playing the whole game in a 2–0 away win against Eastleigh. He was the first choice goalkeeper for Basingstoke throughout the season, and he played 47 times in all competitions as the club reached the Conference South play-offs as a result of their fifth-place finish. They ultimately exited at the play-off semi-final stage, losing 3–1 on aggregate to eventual play-off winners, Dartford, with Bayes playing in both games.

He remained at Basingstoke for the 2012–13 season having signed a new one-year deal in March 2012, and made 40 appearances in all competitions as the club finished the season in mid-table. Bayes left Basingstoke by mutual consent on 29 May 2013, in order to take up a full-time coaching role with a "club further up the football ladder". On leaving the club, Bayes said "At my time of life I needed to think about my career beyond playing first team football and this new job allows me to concentrate on my long term aims. I leave Basingstoke with a heavy heart, it wasn't an easy decision to make and I would like to thank everybody at the club for being so supportive to me and the team since I've been at Basingstoke". He made 87 appearances for the club in all competitions during his two-year stay.

AFC Wimbledon
Following his departure from Basingstoke, Bayes was appointed as a full-time goalkeeping coach by AFC Wimbledon manager Neal Ardley on 19 June 2013. He was also registered as a player so he could play for the club in first-team matches if called upon.

International career
He represented England at under-18 level in 1991, playing in a 3–1 loss to Mexico under-18s in Port of Spain.

Personal life
Bayes was born in Lincoln, Lincolnshire.

Career statistics

A.  The "League" column constitutes appearances and goals (including those as a substitute) in the Football League, League of Ireland and Conference.
B.  The "Other" column constitutes appearances and goals (including those as a substitute) in the FA Trophy, Football League Trophy, Football League play-offs, Conference play-offs and Conference South play-offs.

Honours
Bohemians
League of Ireland Premier Division: 2002–03

Grays Athletic
Conference South: 2004–05
FA Trophy: 2004–05, 2005–06

Stevenage
FA Trophy: 2008–09; runner-up: 2009–10
Conference Premier: 2009–10
League Two play-offs: 2010–11

Individual
Exeter City Player of the Year: 1998–99

References

External links

1972 births
Living people
Sportspeople from Lincoln, England
English footballers
Association football goalkeepers
Brentford F.C. players
Torquay United F.C. players
Exeter City F.C. players
Leyton Orient F.C. players
Bohemian F.C. players
Woking F.C. players
Hornchurch F.C. players
Grays Athletic F.C. players
Crawley Town F.C. players
Stevenage F.C. players
Basingstoke Town F.C. players
AFC Wimbledon players
English Football League players
National League (English football) players
League of Ireland players
AFC Wimbledon non-playing staff
Expatriate association footballers in the Republic of Ireland